Yassine En-Neyah (born 6 June 2000) is an Irish professional footballer who plays as a winger or attacking midfielder for Waterford in the League of Ireland First Division.

Early life
En-Neyah was born in Morocco and moved to the Republic of Ireland at an early age when his mother relocated the family to Dublin. He grew up in the Corduff area of Blanchardstown, playing for his local club Corduff FC, before moving onto League of Ireland club Bohemians.

Club career

Nottingham Forest
En-Neyah joined the Nottingham Forest academy in 2017 from Irish club Bohemians.

He made his professional debut on 5 January 2020, appearing as an 81st-minute substitute during an FA Cup third round match against Chelsea.

Following the 2020-21 season, En-Neyah was not listed on Forest's retained player list.

Shelbourne
On 30 July 2021, it was announced that En-Neyah had signed for League of Ireland First Division side Shelbourne. He made his debut on the same day, in a 2–2 draw at home to Cobh Ramblers. He scored his first goal in senior football on 3 September 2021, in a 4–0 win over Wexford at Tolka Park. He accumulated a total of 10 appearances and 1 goal for the club, as they went on to win the 2021 League of Ireland First Division.

Waterford
On 2 January 2022, En-Neyah signed with First Division side Waterford, following former Shelbourne manager Ian Morris to the club.

International career
En-Neyah was born in Morocco but holds Irish citizenship having been raised in Ireland and has represented the country at under-16 level. He is also eligible to represent Italy through his mother.

Career statistics

Honours
League of Ireland First Division (1): 2021

References

2000 births
Living people
Association footballers from Dublin (city)
Republic of Ireland association footballers
Irish people of Moroccan descent
Irish sportspeople of African descent
Association football midfielders
Nottingham Forest F.C. players
Shelbourne F.C. players
Waterford F.C. players
League of Ireland players